Lucheng Subdistrict is a subdistrict and the seat of Yidu, Hubei, People's Republic of China, located at the intersection of the Qing and Yangtze Rivers. It is named after the Eastern Wu (Three Kingdoms) general Lu Xun who led a resistance against the state of Shu in this area.

Administrative Divisions
, Lucheng Subdistrict had eight residential communities and nine villages under its administration. , the subdistrict has ten residential communities and nine villages.

Ten residential communities:
 Dongfeng, Shengli, Qingjiang, Mingdu, Jiefang, Hongchun, Zhongbi, Toubi, Baziqiao, Jinjiang

Nine villages:
 Liangjianao, Taibaohu, Yimachong, Chejiadian, Weibi, Shilipu, Sanjiang, Baotawan, Longwo

See also
List of township-level divisions of Hubei

References

Township-level divisions of Hubei
Geography of Yichang
Subdistricts of the People's Republic of China